Katy Marchant, (born 30 January 1993) is an elite British track cyclist who specialises in the sprint disciplines. She was educated at Brigshaw High School.

Career
Originally from Leeds, Marchant was based in Manchester after her switch to cycling in April 2013. Marchant began her sporting life as a heptathlete, and represented Great Britain in that event at the 2012 World Junior Championships. The switchover was instigated by her former coach, Toni Minichiello (best known for coaching Jessica Ennis), who suggested the move to cycling having seen the results of her power output on a Wattbike test. Marchant had cycled for leisure on a mountain bike and on the road, but had no experience of track cycling. After a 6-week trial period, she permanently switched to track cycling. She became a member of British Cycling's Olympic Academy in April 2013, and graduated to the Olympic Development Programme in November 2013.

In 2015, she won four national titles at the 2015 British National Track Championships, they were the 500m time trial, Sprint, Keirin and the Team Sprint.

At the 2018 British National Track Championships she won her second time trial and sprint titles to take her tally to six in total. Later that year she won a bronze medal in the Team sprint at the 2018 Commonwealth Games on the Gold Coast.

Marchant was chosen to be part of the UK's 26-strong cycling squad for the postponed 2020 Tokyo Olympics where she was the sprint specialist. She went on to win an Olympic Games bronze medal in the individual sprint.

Marchant won her seventh national title at the 2023 British Cycling National Track Championships, she won the Team Sprint for the second time.

Palmarès

2013
2nd British National Team Sprint Championships (with Victoria Williamson)
British National Track Championships
2nd Keirin race
3rd Match sprint

2014
1st Sprint, Oberhausen
2nd British National Team Sprint Championships (with Victoria Williamson)
British National Track Championships
2nd Individual sprint
3rd Keirin race
3rd 500m time trial
3rd Sprint, Revolution – Round 3, Manchester
3rd Team Sprint, GP von Deutschland im Sprint (with Jessica Varnish)
European U23 Track Championships
3rd Team Sprint (with Rosie Blount)
3rd Keirin race

2015
Revolution
1st Keirin - Round 1, Derby
1st Sprint - Round 1, Derby
1st 500m Time Trial - Round 1, Derby
2nd Sprint – Round 3, Manchester
3rd Keirin – Round 3, Manchester
Trofeu CAR Anadia Portugal
1st Sprint
1st Keirin
Open des Nations sur Piste de Roubaix
1st Sprint
1st Keirin
National Track Championships
1st Individual sprint
1st Keirin
1st Team Sprint (with Jessica Varnish)
1st 500m time trial
UEC European U23 Championships
1st  Keirin
2nd Team Sprint (with Victoria Williamson)
Internationale Radsport Meeting
2nd Sprint
3rd 500m Time Trial
2016
3rd  Sprint, Olympic Games
2nd Keirin, Fenioux Piste International
2017
Siberne Eule von Ludwigshafen
1st Keirin
2nd Sprint
2nd Sprint Internationaal Baan Sprint Keirin Toernooi
2nd Sprint, Öschelbronn

References

External links
 
 

1993 births
Living people
Sportspeople from Leeds
English female cyclists
British heptathletes
English track cyclists
Cyclists at the 2016 Summer Olympics
Cyclists at the 2020 Summer Olympics
Olympic cyclists of Great Britain
Olympic bronze medallists for Great Britain
Medalists at the 2016 Summer Olympics
Olympic medalists in cycling
Commonwealth Games medallists in cycling
Commonwealth Games bronze medallists for England
Cyclists at the 2018 Commonwealth Games
European Games competitors for Great Britain
Cyclists at the 2019 European Games
Medallists at the 2018 Commonwealth Games